Thomas Schoorel was the defending champion.
Andrey Kuznetsov won the final 7–6(8–6), 7–6(8–6) against Jonathan Dasnières de Veigy.

Seeds

Draw

Finals

Top half

Bottom half

References
 Main Draw
 Qualifying Draw

Tennis Napoli Cup - Singles
2012 Singles